Ikhlaspur is a large village in Bhabua block of Kaimur district, Bihar, India. As of 2011, its population was 11,820, in 2,042 households. It covers an area of 439 hectares, of which 401.7 were used for farmland.

References 

Villages in Kaimur district